Ramiz Tafilaj (born 6 May 1949 in Deçan, FPR Yugoslavia, now Republic of Kosovo) is an Albanian-American businessman, philanthropist, activist, and publisher.

He attended the University of Zagreb before immigrating to the United States in 1974 and continued his higher education in Houston. After starting his career as a computer programmer, Tafilaj became a successful entrepreneur in the high-tech and petrochemical industries. He founded Superior Computer Services and Progressive Chemical Technology, where he serves as chairman of the board, and also owns the Jalifat Publishing Company.

Tafilaj served as President of the Northwest Chamber of Commerce International Division where he promoted Texas businesses internationally, through delegations in countries throughout Europe and Asia. He is Vice President of the Albanian American Business Association of Greater Texas.

Tafilaj is a visionary for freedom and democracy in Albania and Kosova and published the successful Kosova book series, the first-of-its-kind comprehensive history of Kosova. As owner of the Jalifat Publishing, he has published works by major Kosovar writers such as Jusuf Buxhovi, Hajredin Kuçi, Faton Bislimi, Avni Spahiu, and Nuhi Vinca.

A staunch advocate for education, Tafilaj sponsored more than 100 students from around the world in their pursuit of learning, including students from Kosovo, Russia, Turkey, Egypt, Europe and the Middle East.

In 2018, Tafilaj was honored with the President's Lifetime Achievement Award, the highest distinction given to civilians who model the American spirit. In 2019, in his hometown of Deçan, he received recognition from by his peers for his contributions in promoting democracy through his work in publishing. And in 2020 Tafilaj received Idriz Seferi Freedom Certificate for his contributions in educating the community’s youth in Gjilan.

In September 2021, the Mayor of Vushtrria, Xhafer Tahiri, honored Ramiz Tafilaj with gratitude, with motivation for the contribution made to the affirmation of the National Issue, for the work done by students and students, their supporters with scholarships as well as for the affirmation of Albanian culture and history.

In December 2022, the Municipality of Pukë gives him the title "Citizen of Honor" for his contribution to the democratization of Albania, the liberation and independence of Kosovo.

Tafilaj has been married to his wife, Diane, for 47 years and they have three adult children—an entrepreneur, a VP in the banking industry, and a nonprofit executive—and nine grandchildren.

References

1949 births
Living people
University of Zagreb alumni
University of Houston alumni
Yugoslav emigrants to the United States
20th-century Albanian businesspeople
21st-century Albanian businesspeople
20th-century American businesspeople
21st-century American businesspeople
American people of Albanian descent
People from Deçan